Bess Berman (July 14, 1902 – August 8, 1968) was an American record label executive. With her husband Isaac "Ike" Berman, Herman "Hy" Siegel and Sam Schneider, she set up Apollo Records, an independent label notable for its promotion of gospel and R&B musicians, in New York City in 1944.

Biography
She was born Bessie Merenstein in New York, the fourth of seven children of Emma and Louis Merenstein, Jewish immigrants from Germany. It is likely both her parents were born in Russia and fled the pogroms to Germany and then the United States where they met and married. Her father drove a beer truck and was later a hat maker; her mother was a housewife. Berman worked as an office clerk and manicurist before marrying vending machine salesman Ike Berman (né Behrman, May 16, 1897–February 5, 1956) in 1926. Ike had two children from a previous marriage: Harriet Berman Merenstein (who in 1936 married Bess' younger brother Charles Merenstein, a co-writer of the song Handy Man); and Jack Berman.

They set up Apollo Records in 1944, and she became the driving force behind its development, particularly in recruiting star performers including Mahalia Jackson, Champion Jack Dupree, The "5" Royales, Wynonie Harris, The Larks, and Solomon Burke.  She took sole control of the business in 1948, while her husband ran an associated record pressing plant. According to songwriter Doc Pomus, she was "very tough... a very strong, aggressive woman."  When she gave up the business after becoming ill in 1954, Cash Box described her as "the only woman ever able to break through with outstanding success in the male-dominated recording industry."

She died in 1968, although some sources give a date in 1997.  Her nephew is the record producer and executive Lewis Merenstein.

References

1902 births
1968 deaths
Businesspeople from New York City
American music industry executives
A&R people
American people of German-Jewish descent
20th-century American Jews
20th-century American businesspeople